Terje Tvedt (born 24 August 1951) is a Norwegian academic, author and documentary film maker. 

Tvedt is presently a professor at the Department of Geography, University of Bergen, and Professor in Global History, University of Oslo, Norway. He has previously been a professor of political science and development studies.

Career and work
Tvedt has published extensively on world history and water, colonial history and the international development aid system. He has also written on the Norwegian modern history of ideas with an emphasis on dominant worldviews in the era of development aid. His books on Norwegian history has created very much discussions and public interest in Norway. His books have been translated into a number of languages, as Arabic, Chinese, Danish, Dutch, English, German, Serbian, Swedish, and Ukraine. 

Tvedt has written and presented a number of award-winning TV-documentaries shown all over the world. 'A Journey in the History of Water'. This film won the first prize as the best environmental documentary in the world in 1998, see, The Future of Water, and The Nile Quest deal with world history and water. His other documentaries deal with development aid and the international aid system (in Norwegian). The films have been bought by networks like National Geographic, Discovery, Al Jazeera, Al Arabyya, Documentary channel and Netflix. See the YouTube channel on Water and World History.

Awards
He has received several awards for his research, such as the Research Council of Norway's Award for Excellence in Communication of Science, the Article of the Year – The Scandinavian University Press Academic Journal Prize and the Fritt Ord Prize.

Bibliography 

Selected non-Norwegian book titles:

 Tvedt, Terje, The Nile. History's Greatest River, London: IB Tauris/Bloomsbury, 2021.
 Tvedt, Terje, Water and Society. Changing Perspectives of Societal and Historical Development. London: IB Tauris/Bloomsbury, 2021.
 Tvedt, Terje. Der Nil. Fluss der Geschichte, Berlin: Links, 2021
 Tvedt, Terje, Series Editor, A History of Water, (12 volumes, 3 series) London: IB Tauris, 2006-2016).
 Tvedt, Terje and Terje Oestigaard, T. (eds). A History of Water: Series III : Vol. III: ''Water and Food – From hunter-gatherers to global production in Africa. (Series Editor, Terje Tvedt), London: IB Tauris.  2016.
 Tvedt, Terje, O. McIntyre, and T.K. Woldetsadik, T. K. (eds). A History of Water: Series III : Vol. II: Sovereignty and International Water Law. (Series Editor Terje Tvedt), London: IB Tauris., 2015.
 Tvedt, Terje and Terje Oestigaard, T. (eds.) A History of Water: Series III : Vol. I: [https://terjetvedt.w.uib.no/files/2017/03/Vol7.pdf Water and Urbanization]. (Series Editor, Terje Tvedt), London: IB Tauris, 2014'''
 Tvedt, Terje, A Journey in the Future of Water. I.B. Tauris, London/New York.2016.
 Tvedt, Terje, G. Chapman and R. Hagen (eds). A History of Water: Series II : Vol III: Water, Geopolitics and the New World Order. (Series Editor Terje Tvedt), London: I.B. Tauris. 2011.
 Tvedt, Terje and R. Coopey (eds.) (A History of Water: Series II : Vol. II: Rivers and Society: From early Civilizations to Modern Times. (Series Editor Terje Tvedt), London: Tauris.. 2011.
 Tvedt, Terje and T Oestigaard, (eds.) (2010). A History of Water: Series II : Vol. I: Ideas of Water From Ancient Societies to the Modern World. (Series Editor Terje Tvedt), London: I.B. Tauris 2010. 2011.
 Tvedt, Terje (ed), The River Nile in the post-colonial Age: conflict and cooperation among the Nile Basin countries. London: IB Tauris. 2010.
 Opku-Mensah, Paul, David Lewis and Terje Tvedt (eds). Reconceptualising NGOs and their roles in Development: NGOs, Civil Society and the International Aid System. Aalborg: Aalborg Universitetsforlag.. 2007.
 Tvedt, Terje and Terje Østigård (Red): A History of Water: Series I : Vol. III: The World of Water. (Series editor Terje Tvedt), London: Tauris. 2006.
 Tvedt, Terje, The River Nile in the Age of the British. Political Ecology and the Quest for Economic Power. Cairo: The American University in Cairo Press. (Re-published in paperback version in 2017, New York: Macmillan, London: IB. Tauris).
 Coopey, Richard and Terje Tvedt (eds) A History of Water: series I: Vol. II: The Political Economy of Water. (Series editor Terje Tvedt), London: Tauris.. 2006.
 Tvedt, Terje and E. Jakobsson (eds).A History of Water: series I: Vol. I: Water Control and River Biographies. (Series editor Terje Tvedt), London: Tauris, 2006.
 Tvedt, Terje, The River Nile in the Age of the British. Political Ecology and the Quest for Economic Power. London: Tauris.. (Translated into, and published in Arabic, Cairo 2018).
 Tvedt, Terje, The River Nile: An annotated bibliography. (2nd edition), London: IB Tauris., 2004.
 Tvedt, Terje et al. Southern Sudan: An Annotated Bibliography (2 Vols.), London: Tauris. 2004.
 Tvedt, Terje, Angels of Mercy or Development Diplomats? NGOs & Aid. Oxford: James Currey Publishers. 1998.
 Sharif Harir and Terje Tvedt (eds). A short cut to decay: the case of the Sudan. Uppsala: Nordiske Afrikainstituttet, (Republished in Arabic, Cairo 1996). 1994.
 Tvedt, Terje, (ed.) Conflicts in the Horn of Africa: human and ecological consequences of warfare'' (red). . Uppsala: EPOS,.1993.

TV-Documentaries 

Selected documentaries include:

 2014: The Nile Quest, 3 episodes, (Norwegian Broadcasting Cooperation/Panopticon
 2013: The Good Bombs", NRK Brennpunkt
 2010: A Drop of Luxury", TV 2, Dokument 2
 2007: The Future of Water, 3 episodes, TV2/Panopticon
 1997: A Journey in the History of Water, 4 episodes, Nowegain Broadcasting Cooperation

References 

1951 births
Living people
Academic staff of the University of Bergen
Academic staff of the University of Oslo
Norwegian non-fiction writers